Mathéo Tuscher (born 12 December 1996 in Noville) is a Swiss-French former professional racing driver.

Career

Karting
Tuscher began karting in 2004 and raced primarily in his native Switzerland for the majority of his career, winning Swiss KF3 championship in 2008.

Formula Pilota China
In 2011 at just fourteen years, Tuscher graduated to single–seaters, racing in the newly launched Formula Pilota China series in Asia for Jenzer Welch Asia Racing under Czech racing license.  He dominated from beginning of the season, winning eight races on all six venues and the championship title.

FIA Formula Two Championship
In 2012 Tuscher stepped up into FIA Formula Two Championship. He became the youngest ever driver in the revived category, competing at the age of fifteen. On his series début at Silverstone, Tuscher qualified on pole position by 0.2 seconds from closest rival Luciano Bacheta. He finished sixth and fifth in the weekend's races. He scored his first podium of the series in the following round in Algarve, finishing second in both races, and moving into second in the standings.

Formula Renault 3.5 Series
Tuscher made his Formula Renault 3.5 Series debut at Motorland Aragón, replacing Emmanuel Piget at Zeta Corse team.

Racing record

Career summary

Complete FIA Formula Two Championship results
(key) (Races in bold indicate pole position) (Races in italics indicate fastest lap)

Complete GP3 Series results
(key) (Races in bold indicate pole position) (Races in italics indicate fastest lap)

Complete FIA World Endurance Championship results

24 Hours of Le Mans results

References

External links
 
 

1996 births
Living people
People from Aigle District
Swiss-French people
Swiss racing drivers
French racing drivers
Formula Masters China drivers
FIA Formula Two Championship drivers
World Series Formula V8 3.5 drivers
Swiss GP3 Series drivers
24 Hours of Le Mans drivers
Sportspeople from the canton of Vaud
FIA World Endurance Championship drivers
Jenzer Motorsport drivers
Zeta Corse drivers
Rebellion Racing drivers